Titus Bronson (November 27, 1788 – January 6, 1853) is regarded as the eccentric founder of the city of Kalamazoo, Michigan.

In 1829, Titus Bronson, originally from Connecticut, was the first settler to build a cabin within the present city limits. He platted the town in 1831 and named it the village of Bronson (not to be confused with the much smaller Bronson, Michigan about 50 miles (80 km) to the south-southeast).

Bronson was frequently described as "eccentric" and argumentative and was later run out of town. The village of Bronson was renamed Kalamazoo in 1836 (due in part to an incident resulting in Bronson's being fined for stealing a cherry tree). Today, a hospital and a park, among other things, are named after Titus Bronson.

After leaving Kalamazoo, Bronson found his way to Davenport, Iowa, where, in 1842, he lost most of his money in a land swindle. His wife also died in that same year. Bronson lived in Illinois for a short while, and then returned to Connecticut where he died a broken man. His headstone reads: "A Western Pioneer, Returned to Sleep with his Fathers."

Sources

1788 births
1853 deaths
People from Connecticut
People from Davenport, Iowa
People from Kalamazoo, Michigan
American city founders